The 1946 Tennessee gubernatorial election was held on November 5, 1946. Incumbent Democrat Jim Nance McCord defeated Republican nominee William O. Lowe with 65.35% of the vote.

Primary elections
Primary elections were held on August 1, 1946.

Democratic primary

Candidates
Jim Nance McCord, incumbent Governor
Gordon Browning, former Governor
John Randolph Neal Jr., attorney 
Leah Richardson

Results

General election

Candidates
Major party candidates
Jim Nance McCord, Democratic
William O. Lowe, Republican

Other candidates
John Randolph Neal Jr., Independent

Results

References

1946
Tennessee
Gubernatorial